The Vidhan Sabha  Metro Station is located on the Yellow Line of the Delhi Metro. It services the area around Delhi Legislative Assembly (Vidhan Sabha), and Majnu Ka Tilla, which is 1.5 km away.

Station layout

Connections

See also

References

External links

 Delhi Metro Rail Corporation Ltd. (Official site) 
 Delhi Metro Annual Reports
 

Delhi Metro stations
Railway stations opened in 2004
Railway stations in North Delhi district
2004 establishments in Delhi